Koca Mehmed Pasha may refer to:

 Koca Dervish Mehmed Pasha (died 1655), Ottoman grand vizier (1652–1653) and Kapudan Pasha (1652)
 Koca Hüsrev Mehmed Pasha (1769–1855), Ottoman grand vizier (1839–1841) and Kapudan Pasha (1823–1827)
 Koca Mehmed Nizamüddin Pasha (died 1439), Ottoman grand vizier (1429–1438)
 Koca Ragıp Mehmet Pasha (1698–1763), Ottoman grand vizier (1757–1763)